Lammbock is a 2001 German stoner film. The protagonists of the movie are two pizza delivery men who decide to up their income by adding marijuana to the menu and get into trouble after attracting the attention of an undercover cop. There are numerous subplots, and the movie is essentially divided into various chapters, each dealing with different episodes. It is filmed in and around the Franconian city of Würzburg and in Cologne, North Rhine-Westphalia.

Plot 
Kai and Stefan are two friends who own a gourmet pizza delivery business as a front for selling cannabis. Stefan is finishing law school and preparing to take the Bar examination to become a lawyer under the behest of his father, who is a judge. They visit their outdoor cannabis growing operation only to discover that aphids are destroying their plants. They visit a head shop and meet Achim, who informs them that he knows how to get rid of aphids, handing them a tub full of Aphidoletes aphidimyza. However, unbeknownst to the protagonists, Achim is an undercover police officer.

After much debate, the duo decide to bring Achim to the plantation so that he can help with the aphid problem, using an adulterant on the plants called "Brain cell massacre," which, according to Achim, is used in Kazakhstan plantations. On the way to the growing area, they try to pick psychedelic mushrooms, convinced that nobody will be suspicious of mushrooms on a pizza. They test them out on Achim while he is at the plantation, stating that they already tried some. Achim is poisoned by the mushrooms and goes into a convulsive state, when suddenly a hunter is spotted nearby. The "Brain cell massacre" is used to knock Achim out, and he is locked in the protagonists' trunk, along with the hunter who discovered the cannabis plantation as well as the harvested crop itself.

After narrowly avoiding an unrelated police search, the duo confront Stefan's father and confess their situation. Though Stefan's father becomes upset, he calls the chief of police, whom he befriended when he was a public prosecutor. With the help of the chief of police, the duo get off the hook, and Stefan takes his bar exam only to walk out at the last minute to pursue his lifelong dream of owning a cafe on a beach.

Cast 

 Lucas Gregorowicz as Stefan Becker 
 Moritz Bleibtreu as Kai
 Marie Zielcke as Laura Becker
 Julian Weigend as Achim
 Elmar Wepper as Vater Becker
 Alexandra Schalaudek as Gina
 Christof Wackernagel as Ausbilder Walter
 Antoine Monot, Jr. as Schöngeist
 Wotan Wilke Möhring as Frank
 Nils Brunkhorst as Dopex
 Alexandra Neldel as Jenny
 Christoph Künzler as Jäger
 Peter Fieseler as Tim
 Thomas Schende as Dr. Kollmann
 Anya Hoffmann as Elena Kollmann

Trivia 
The director was heavily influenced by Quentin Tarantino and Kevin Smith. The characters Frank and Schöngeist bear a striking resemblance to Smith's duo Jay and Silent Bob.
German soccer player Mehmet Scholl is repeatedly referenced in the movie's dialogue, posters in the movie and as a player in a soccer video game that the two protagonists play.
In the beginning of the film Stefan drives on the Old Main Bridge (the bridge crossing the river Main) in Würzburg, even though it is only accessible to pedestrians.
The original film location of the pizzeria is in Cologne, where it is still existing. The university scenes were shot at the Technical University of Cologne.

Sequel 

After asking followers of his Facebook page whether they want to see a sequel of the 2001 film and receiving great approval, Bleibtreu announced the film Lommbock in November 2015, scheduled for release on March 23, 2017. Filming began in August 2016, and Lommbock premiered in Germany 23 March 2017

References

External links 

2001 films
2001 comedy films
German comedy films
German films about cannabis
Films produced by Sönke Wortmann
Films shot in Cologne
2000s German films